Jacob Leib Talmon (Hebrew: יעקב טלמון; June 14, 1916 – June 16, 1980) was Professor of Modern History at the Hebrew University of Jerusalem.

He studied the genealogy of totalitarianism, arguing that political Messianism stemmed from the French Revolution, and stressed the similarities between Jacobinism and Stalinism. He coined the terms "totalitarian democracy" and "Messianic democracy/political Messianism".

Biography
Talmon was born in Rypin, a town in central Poland, into an Orthodox Jewish family. He left in 1934 to study at the Hebrew University in Jerusalem, then in the British Mandate of Palestine, now Israel. He continued his studies in France but left for London after the Nazi invasion; in 1943 he was awarded a PhD from the London School of Economics. His main works are The Origins of Totalitarian Democracy and Political Messianism: The Romantic Phase. Talmon argued that Rousseau's position may best be understood as "totalitarian democracy", a philosophy in which liberty is realized "only in the pursuit and attainment of an absolute collective purpose." Following the 1967 Six-Day War, Talmon engaged in a debate with Arnold J. Toynbee on the role of Jews and Zionism in history.

Talmon died in Jerusalem on June 16, 1980, two days after his 64th birthday.

Awards
In 1957, Talmon was awarded the Israel Prize, for social sciences.

Major works
 ; vol. 2: 1960
 The Nature of Jewish History-Its Universal Significance, 1957
 Political Messianism – The Romantic Phase, 1960
 The Unique and The Universal, 1965
 Romanticism and Revolt, 1967
 Israel among the Nations, 1968
 The Age of Violence, 1974
 The Myth of Nation and Vision of Revolution – The Origins of Ideological Polarization in the 20th Century, 1981
 The Riddle of the Present and the Cunning of History, 2000 (Hebrew, p.m.)

See also
Totalitarian democracy
List of Israel Prize recipients

References

External links

Two Statements on the Mid-East War, 1973
 Arie Dubnov, 'A tale of trees and crooked timbers: Jacob Talmon and Isaiah Berlin on the question of Jewish Nationalism', History of European Ideas, Vol. 34, No. 2
 Arie Dubnov, 'Priest or Jester? Jacob L. Talmon (1916-1980) on History and Intellectual engagement (Introduction essay)', History of European Ideas, Vol. 34, No. 2

Talmon, J. L.
Talmon, J. L.
Talmon, J. L.
Talmon, J. L.
Talmon, J. L.
Talmon, J. L.
Israeli Ashkenazi Jews
Israeli Orthodox Jews
Talmon, J. L.
Talmon, J. L.
Talmon, J. L.
Orthodox Jews in Mandatory Palestine
Members of the Israel Academy of Sciences and Humanities
People from Rypin County
Polish emigrants to Israel
Polish Orthodox Jews
20th-century Israeli historians
20th-century political scientists